Shaikh Abdullah Mohammed Al-Hugail  (born 1942, Al Majma'ah, Saudi Arabia) is a businessman. He is the former and longest-serving Chairman of the Saudi British Bank SABB (an affiliate of the HSBC Group) for nearly twenty two years. From 1997 to 2005 he was a member of the Majlis Al Shura. He received his Degree in Arabic Language and Literature, from Imam Muhammad bin Saud Islamic University in Riyadh.

Past occupations
1962 - 1963 Assistant Secretary General for Administrative Affairs, Higher Planning Council (Saudi Arabia)
1963 - 1964 Director General of Financial Administrative Affairs, Central Planning Committee (Saudi Arabia)
1964 - 1969 Director General of Staff Affairs, Department of Municipal Affairs in the Ministry of Internal Affairs (Saudi Arabia)
1969 - 1974 Assistant Deputy Minister, Ministry of Municipal and Rural Affairs (Saudi Arabia)
1974 - 1975 Deputy Minister, Ministry of Municipal and Rural Affairs (Saudi Arabia)
1975 - 2009 Chairman and President of the Trading & Development Partnership (Saudi Arabia)
1987 - 2009 Chairman of the Saudi British Bank (SABB) an affiliate of HSBC Holdings Plc 
1988 - 1996 Member of Al Riyadh Provincial Council Chaired by Prince Salman Bin Abdulaziz, Governor of Riyadh Province 
1997 - 2005 Member of Majlis Al Shura (Saudi Arabia)

See also
The Saudi British Bank
Saudi Arabia

References

1942 births
Living people
Saudi Arabian businesspeople
Members of the Consultative Assembly of Saudi Arabia
HSBC people
Imam Muhammad ibn Saud Islamic University alumni
People from Riyadh Province